The Schnebelhorn is a mountain located near Fischenthal in the Töss Valley, between the cantons of Zurich (west) and St. Gallen (east). It is the highest summit of the canton of Zurich.

Various trails lead to the summit from all sides. Most of the massif is covered by forests.

References

External links

 Schnebelhorn on Hikr
 From Toggenburg to the highest Point of Canton Zürich MySwitzerland.com

Mountains of the Alps
Mountains of Switzerland
Highest points of Swiss cantons
Mountains of the canton of Zürich
Appenzell Alps
St. Gallen–Zürich border